is an amateur Japanese freestyle wrestler, who competes in the middleweight category (under 74 kg).

Takatani represented Japan at the 2012 Summer Olympics in London, but was eliminated in the qualifying round.

At the 2016 Olympics he reached the quarterfinals, beating Talgat Ilyasov and Zelimkhan Khadjiev before losing to Galymzhan Userbayev.

He competed in the 92kg event at the 2022 World Wrestling Championships held in Belgrade, Serbia.

References

External links
NBC Olympics Profile
 

1989 births
Living people
Japanese male sport wrestlers
Olympic wrestlers of Japan
Wrestlers at the 2012 Summer Olympics
Wrestlers at the 2016 Summer Olympics
People from Kyoto Prefecture
World Wrestling Championships medalists
Wrestlers at the 2020 Summer Olympics
21st-century Japanese people